Paris By Night 88: Lam Phương - Đường Về Quê Hương (The Road Back to my homeland) is a Paris By Night program produced by Thúy Nga that was filmed at the Hobby Center for the Performing Arts in Houston, Texas on Saturday, May 5, 2007. It is a direct continuation of Paris By Night 22: 40 Năm Âm Nhạc Lam Phương and Paris By Night 28: Lam Phương 2 - Dòng Nhạc Nối Tiếp, that was released several years earlier. This program was codenamed, In Houston 2 (which was thought to be a successor to Paris By Night 36: In Houston, before the title was announced). Before the main subject title was announced, the program was then codenamed to In Houston 2: Lam Phương 3 (the third Lam Phương series). The three was scrapped off the title and the subject was simply, Lam Phương.

Vietnamese composer, Lam Phương, is one of the Vietnamese community's most famous composers today; composing famous songs before and even after the Vietnam War, and the Fall of Saigon in 1975. Since the early years of Paris By Night, Thúy Nga has been making single-composer videos dedicated to just a single composer. Starting in Paris By Night 64: Ðêm Văn Nghệ Thính Phòng however, Thuy Nga introduced the three-composer format. That trend continued in Paris By Night 66: Người Tình và Quê Hương, Paris By Night 70: Thu Ca, Paris By Night 74: Hoa Bướm Ngày Xưa, Paris By Night 78: Ðường Xưa, and finally in Paris By Night 83: Những Khúc Hát Ân Tình. However, composer Lam Phương is an exception. After being beloved by many, and his songs are in a timeless label, Thúy Nga thought that he should deserve the entire program just dedicated to him and his songs, in a program that was meant for three composers.

Paris By Night 88 is Thúy Nga's third live-performance show, after Paris By Night 86 and 87, which was the PBN Talent Show. This is a trend that Thúy Nga may be beginning to adapt, after years of having singers lip-sync on stage, a practice that is common and accepted in the Vietnamese music community.

Paris By Night 88 used famous songs that was originally performed in Paris By Night 28 and Paris By Night 22, which were part of the Lam Phương series.

This is also director Alan Carter's first direction of Paris By Night, in place of its regular director, Michael Watt after many years. Carter has been credited to many successful programs, including the 2007 Miss America Pageant, the 2007 CMT Music Awards, and the 2005 Miss Universe Pageant.

Track list

Disc 1

01. Đoàn Người Lữ Thứ - Thế Sơn, Trần Thái Hòa, Lương Tùng Quang, Dương Triệu Vũ, Trịnh Lam, Huy Tâm, Tâm Đoan, Hương Thủy, Ngọc Liên, Ngọc Loan, Quỳnh Vi, Hương Giang

02. Kiếp Nghèo - Ý Lan

03. Thành Phố Buồn, Tình Như Mây Khói - Chế Linh, Mai Quốc Huy

04. Tiễn Người Đi - Hương Lan

05. Bức Tâm Thư - Như Loan, Ngọc Loan

06. Chiều Tàn - Hoàng Oanh

07. Biết Đến Bao Giờ, Đêm Tiền Đồn - Mạnh Quỳnh, Trường Vũ

08. Ngày Hạnh Phúc - Tâm Đoan, Hương Thủy, Minh Tuyết, Ngọc Liên

09. Nghẹn Ngào - Khánh Hà

10. Phút Cuối - Bằng Kiều

11. Em Đi Rồi - Họa Mi

12. Musical : Chuyện Tình Thời Chinh Chiến 
Ngày Tạm Biệt
Khóc Thầm
Chiều Hoang Vắng
Con Tàu Định Mệnh
Mất
Vĩnh Biệt Người Tình
- Như Quỳnh, Thế Sơn & Supporting by: Lương Tùng Quang, Trịnh Lam, Huy Tâm & Quỳnh Vi

13. Chuyến Đò Vỹ Tuyến - Tâm Đoan

14. Đường Về Quê Hương - Quang Lê

Disc 2

15. Nắng Đẹp Miền Nam, Khúc Ca Ngày Mùa - Hà Phương, Hương Thủy

16. Skit : Lầm - Hoài Linh, Chí Tài

17. Say, Lầm - Dương Triệu Vũ, Trịnh Lam

18. Ngày Em Đi - Nguyễn Hưng

19. Cho Em Quên Tuổi Ngọc - Bạch Yến, Trần Thu Hà

20. Liên Khúc : 
Thiên Đàng Ái Ân
Chỉ Có Em
Tình Vẫn Chưa Yên
- Bảo Hân, Thủy Tiên, Lương Tùng Quang

21. Liên Khúc : 
Trăm Nhớ Ngàn Thương
Tình Bơ Vơ
- Trần Thái Hòa, Ngọc Liên

22. Bài Tango Cho Em - Khánh Ly

23. Mùa Thu Yêu Đương - Huy Tâm, Quỳnh Vi

24. Chờ Người - Bằng Kiều, Trần Thu Hà

25. Mình Mất Nhau Bao Giờ - Minh Tuyết

26. Một Mình - Hương Giang

Paris by Night

vi:Paris By Night 88